Richard Ingle (1609–1653) was an English colonial seaman, ship captain, tobacco trader, privateer, and pirate in the American colony of Maryland. Ingle took over the colonial capital of the proprietary government in St. Mary's City removing Catholic Governor Lord Baltimore from power in 1645. Along with another Protestant rebel, Captain William Claiborne, he waged war with the Catholic colonial Governor Lord Baltimore and Maryland Catholics in the name of English Parliament after his ship was seized and confiscated and siding with the Maryland Puritans, in a period known as the "Plundering Time" in which unrest and lawlessness existed. Ingle and his men attacked ships and conquered 
the colonial capital, St. Mary's City, Province of Maryland. Most of the Richard Ingle's life and background are unknown.

Early life
Richard Ingle was born in England, possibly in London, into a Protestant family that schooled him. He became a trader and ship captain. He transported the goods of Maryland colonial traders from England and back and later became a prominent trader of tobacco.

War with Lord Baltimore and Catholics in Maryland Colony
When the English Civil War broke out, Ingle sided with the Puritans. He fell out with the Catholic leaders of Maryland, and when the royalist governor Leonard Calvert seized his ship, he escaped.

Richard Ingle returned in February 1645 with the ship Reformation and attacked the Maryland colony in the name of English Parliament. He attacked the settlement of St. Mary's City, the colonial capital and imprisoned leaders of the colony. Calvert, the royalist proprietary governor, fled to Virginia.

Plundering Time

Captain Richard Ingle took control of the Maryland colonial government and along with fellow Protestant Captain William Claiborne, an Anglican church adherent, ushered in a period of unrest and lawlessness from 1644 to 1646 known as the "Plundering Time" and "Claiborne and Ingle's rebellion". Under Ingle's leadership, his men looted property of wealthy Roman Catholic settlers. Ingle claimed that he had a letter of marque to cruise the waters of Shesapeake (Chesapeake Bay) and the permission of a new government in England. Local settlers regarded him as a pirate. He put two Jesuit priests Andrew White and Thomas Copley in chains and transported them back to England.

End of Rebellion
Governor Calvert returned in August 1646 and reestablished his control.

Death
Though most of his men were granted amnesty, Richard Ingle according to some sources was specifically exempted from being released, made an example of and executed as a pirate in 1653.

References

Sources
Donnelly, Mark P. and Daniel Diehl.  Pirates of Maryland: Plunder and High Adventure in the Chesapeake Bay.  Mechanicsburg, PA:  Stackpole Books, 2012.
 Ingle, Edward. Captain Richard Ingle: the Maryland pirate and rebel, 1642–1653  Baltimore:  John Murphy & Co., 1884]
Maloney, Eric John. "Papists and Puritans in Early Maryland: Religion in the Forging of Provincial Society, 1632–1665". PhD. Dissertation. Stony Brook, NY:  State University of New York at Stony Brook, 1996.
Riordan, Timothy B.  Plundering Time: Maryland and the English Civil War, 1645–1646.  Baltimore:  Maryland Historical Society, 2004.

External links
Richard Ingle In Maryland – Maryland Historical Society

1609 births
1653 deaths
English businesspeople
Executed English people
People executed by the Province of Maryland
St. Mary's City, Maryland